Pu Chao Saming Phrai is a town (Thesaban Mueang) in the Phra Pradaeng District (Amphoe) of Samut Prakan Province in the Bangkok Metropolitan Region of Central Thailand. In 2015, it had a total population of 77,976 people.

References

Populated places in Samut Prakan province